Witowo may refer to the following places:
Witowo, Koło County in Greater Poland Voivodeship (west-central Poland)
Witowo, Kuyavian-Pomeranian Voivodeship (north-central Poland)
Witowo, Podlaskie Voivodeship (north-east Poland)
Witowo, Środa Wielkopolska County in Greater Poland Voivodeship (west-central Poland)
Witowo, Warmian-Masurian Voivodeship (north Poland)